This is a chronological index for the start year for motor vehicle brands (up to 1969). For manufacturers that went on to produce many models, it represents the start date of the whole brand; for the others, it usually represents the date of appearance of the main (perhaps only) model that was produced.

This also gives an idea of what motor vehicles were appearing on the streets in each country around each date (allowing, too, for imports from other countries). Moreover, by showing which models were contemporary, it gives a first indication of how individual designers were being influenced by each other, and a flavor of the entrepreneurial spirit and dynamics of the pioneering days of motor vehicle manufacture.

Within each year, and country of origin, the lists are structured according to the type of vehicle first introduced. These include the following types: steam, electric, hybrid electric, internal-combustion, touring car, roadster, tonneau, phaeton, cyclecar, light car, voiturette, runabout, high wheeler, buggy, tricar, motor quadricycle, motor tricycle, motorcycle, coach, bus, fire-engine, truck, tractor, racing car, avant-train.

Veteran era

1860
Thomas Rickett's steam-powered car was particularly notable in the history of motor vehicle production inasmuch as several examples were made, and it was also advertised.

UK. Steam: Rickett

1861
US. Steam: Ware Steam Wagon

1873
The Bollée family played a significant part in the history of motor vehicle manufacture; the father with his steam car, and one of his sons, in 1895, with an internal-combustion engine design.

France. Steam bus: Amédée Bollée

1883

France. Steam: De Dion-Bouton (later internal-combustion, with a patent in 1889)

1884
France. Internal-combustion: Delamare-Deboutteville

1885
Karl Benz's vehicle was the first true automobile, entirely designed as such, rather than simply being a motorized stage coach or horse carriage. This is why he was granted his patent, and is regarded as its inventor. His wife and sons became the first true motorists, in 1889, when they took the car out for the specific task of paying a family visit.

Germany. Internal-combustion: Benz

UK. Internal-combustion: Butler

Austria-Hungary. Internal-combustion: Laurin & Klement (later Škoda)

US. Electric: Armstrong Electric

1852?
Russia. Motorcycle: Alexander Leutner & Co.

1887
UK. Motorcycle: New Imperial

1889
The first Daimler car was a converted carriage, but with innovations that are still adopted today (cushioned engine mountings, fan cooling, finned-radiator water cooling).

France. Steam: Peugeot (later internal-combustion, and the first to be entered in an organised race, albeit for bicycles, Paris–Brest–Paris)

Germany. Internal-combustion: Daimler (DMG)

UK. Internal-combustion: Santler

US. Internal-combustion rotary engine: Adams-Farwell

1890
Panhard and Levassor's design of a front-mounted engine established the layout of the majority of cars since then.

France. Internal-combustion: Panhard-Levassor

1891

US. Steam: Black; steam tractor: Avery; internal-combustion: Buckeye gasoline buggy

1893
France. Electric (and later internal-combustion): Jeantaud

UK. Steam: Straker-Squire (also known as Brazil Straker)

US. Internal-combustion: Elmore, Duryea

1894
France. Internal-combustion: Audibert & Lavirotte, Berliet, Delahaye

UK. Electric: Garrard & Blumfield

US. Electric: Electrobat

1895
France. Internal-combustion: Léon Bollée, Corre, Rochet-Schneider

UK. Internal-combustion: Knight, Lanchester

US. Electric: Morris & Salom

US. Internal-combustion: De La Vergne

1896
In the UK, the Locomotives on Highways Act 1896 replaced the hugely restrictive Locomotive Acts of 1861, 1865 and 1878 (the so-called Red Flag acts) thereby finally freeing up the automotive industry in the UK (and, incidentally, was also the origin of the celebrations of the first London to Brighton Veteran Car Run). Knight had been convicted under the old act, the previous year, for not having a man precede his vehicle with a red flag, and Walter Arnold was the first person to be convicted, in January 1896, for exceeding the speed limit. Meanwhile, Serpollet was issued with what was effectively the first driving licence.

France. Steam: Gardner-Serpollet; internal-combustion: Clément-Gladiator, Dalifol, Darracq, Lorraine-Dietrich, Triouleyre; voiturette: Dalifol & Thomas, Goujon, Léon Bollée; motorcycle: Clément and Gladiator

Italy. Internal-combustion: Enrico Bernardi

Russia. Internal-combustion: Yakovlev-Frese

UK. Steam: Leyland; internal-combustion: Anglo-French, Arnold, Arrol-Johnston, Atkinson and Philipson; motorcycle: Excelsior, motor tricycle: Ariel

US. Internal-combustion: Altham, Black, Electric & internal-combustion: Brewster, Haynes-Apperson

1897

France. Steam: Montier & Gillet; electric: Krieger; internal-combustion: Grivel, Juzan, Société Parisienne, Mors; voiturette: Decauville, Richard; avant-train: Amiot

UK. Steam: Toward & Philipson; Electric: Bushbury Electric, Neale; electric phaeton: Electric Motive Power; internal-combustion: Belsize; bus: Thomas Harrington

US. Electric: Pope; Internal-combustion: Autocar, Oldsmobile, Plass, Winton

Austria-Hungary. Internal-combustion: Präsident (Tatra)

1898
Belgium. Internal-combustion: Delecroix, Métallurgique

France. Internal-combustion: Ailloud, Astresse, Auge, David & Bourgeois, De Dietrich, Lufbery, Poron, Tourey; voiturette: Le Blon, De Riancey; trucks and tractors: Latil; avant-train: Ponsard-Ansaloni

Germany. Electric: Kühlstein; internal-combustion: AWE, Wartburg

Italy. Internal-combustion: Ceirano GB & C; motor tricycle/quadricycle: Prinetti & Stucchi

UK. Electric: Oppermann; internal-combustion: Alldays & Onions, Grose, James and Browne, Madelvic, Star; tricar: Humber; motor tricycle/quadricycle: Arsenal, Eadie, Leuchters; motorcycle: Swift,

US. Steam: American Waltham; electric: Riker; internal-combustion: Rutenber, St. Louis; buggy: Stearns

1899

Belgium. Voiturette: Vivinus

France. Electric: Bouquet, Garcin & Schivre, Monnard; internal-combustion: Allard-Latour, Esculape, La Lorraine, Luc Court, Marot-Gardon, Raouval, Renault (including the first saloon car), Turcat-Méry; light car: Naptholette; voiturette: Andre Py, Cochotte, Populaire, Rouxel; alcohol fuelled: L'Alkolumine

Germany. Internal-combustion: Opel

Italy. Internal-combustion: Fiat

Russia. Electric: Kukushka

UK. Electric: Joel-Rosenthal; internal-combustion: Accles-Turrell, Geering; voiturette: Argyll; motor tricycle/quadricycle: Allard, Anglo-American; motorcycle: Coventry-Eagle, OK-Supreme, Quadrant, Royal Enfield

US. Steam: Century, Grout, Kensington, Keystone, Kidder, Leach, Liquid Air, Locomobile, Mobile (pre Stanley Steamer), Strathmore, Victor Steam, Waltham Steam; electric: American Electric, Baker, Columbia (taxi), Electric Vehicle, Quinby, Stearns, US Automobile, Van Wagoner, Woods; internal-combustion: American, Black, Bramwell-Robinson, Gasmobile, Gurley, Holyoke, International, Media, Oakman-Hertel, Packard (Ohio), Quick, Sintz

1900
Belgium. Hybrid: Pieper; internal-combustion: Nagant, Pipe; voiturette: Antoine

Canada. Electric: Canadian Motor

France. Internal-combustion: Ader, Ardent, Chenard-Walcker, Maillard, Nanceene, Otto; voiturette: Chainless, Soncin; motorcycle: Buchet, Castoldi

Germany. Internal-combustion: Adler, Albion; voiturette: AGG; motorcycle (later trucks): Phänomen

Italy. Internal-combustion: Isotta Fraschini

UK. Internal-combustion: Hewinson-Bell, Napier, Smith & Dowse; voiturette: Billings-Burns; motorcycle: Rex-Acme

US. Steam: Tractobile, Kent's Pacemaker, Porter Stanhope, Skene, Steamobile; electric: Hewitt-Lindstrom, National; internal-combustion: Auburn, Canda, California, Eureka, Holley, Keystone, Knox, Lozier, Peerless, Rambler, Stearns-Knight; tractor: Samson; truck: Detroit

1901
Canada. Light car: Queen

France. Internal-combustion: Charron, Corre La Licorne; voiturette: L'Ardennais, Guerraz, Henry-Dubray, Korn et Latil, Malliary; light car: De Boisse

Germany. Internal-combustion: Horch, Stoewer; motorcycle: NSU

UK. Electric: Electromobile; internal-combustion: Asquith, Imperial, John O'Gaunt, Sunbeam, paraffin fuelled: Ralph Lucas; cyclecar: Campion; light car: Ralph Gilbert; voiturette: Wolseley; motorcycle: Matchless, Singer

US. Steam: Aultman, Binney & Burnham, Covert, Desberon, Hidley, Hudson, Reading Steamer, Stearns, White; internal-combustion: Altman, Apperson, Buffalo, Buffum, De Dion, Empire, Marion, Pierce-Arrow, Schaum; touring car: Austin; runabout: Stevens-Duryea; high wheeler: Holsman; motorcycle: Indian

1902
Belgium. Internal-combustion: Minerva

France. Internal-combustion: Motobloc, Richard-Brasier

Germany. Internal-combustion: Aachener, AEG, Argus, Beaufort, NAG; motorised tricycle/quadricycle: Cyklon

Russia. Electric: Dux

Spain. Internal-combustion: Anglada

UK. Steam: Vapomobile; internal-combustion: Abingdon, Armstrong, Karminski, Maudslay, Rover, Vulcan; voiturette: Esculapeus, tricar: Advance; motorcycle: Norton, Triumph

US. Steam: Clipper, Hoffman, Richmond, Stanley; electric: Studebaker; internal-combustion: Blood, Brennan, Cadillac, Cameron, Cannon, Clarkmobile, Franklin (automobile), Gaeth, Hammer-Sommer, Kirk, Marmon, Reber; runabout: Glide (automobile), Smith, Standard Steel; touring car: Spaulding; light car: Greenleaf, Orient; buggy: American, Union; compound expansion: Eisenhuth; truck: Rapid

1903
Belgium. Internal-combustion: Excelsior

France. Internal-combustion: Ariès, Clément-Bayard, Delaunay-Belleville, Hotchkiss, Regal, Talbot; light car: Henry Bauchet

Germany. Internal-combustion bus/truck: Büssing

UK. Electric: Lems; steam (and internal-combustion): Albany; internal-combustion: Attila, Elswick, Kyma, Lea-Francis, Lee Stroyer, Standard, Vauxhall, Whitlock; avant-train: Adams; motorcycle: Chater-Lea, New Hudson, Wilkinson Sword

US. Steam: Jaxon; internal-combustion: American Chocolate (Walter), Bates, Ford, Lenawee, Marble-Swift, Matheson, Vermont, Wilson; touring car: Acme, Berg, Logan, Michigan, Iroquois, Jackson, Phelps, Premier; roadster: Buckmobile; runabout: Dingfelder, Eldredge, Marr, Mitchell, Overland, Sandusky, Tincher

1904
Canada. Internal-combustion: Russell

France. Internal-combustion: Cottin & Desgouttes, Grégoire; voiturette: Lavie; motor tricycle: La Va Bon Train

Germany. Internal-combustion: Alliance, Wenkelmobil

Italy. Internal-combustion: Itala

Spain. Internal-combustion: Hispano-Suiza

UK. Electric: Imperial; internal-combustion: Arbee, Armstrong Whitworth, Ascot, Calthorpe, Chambers, Crossley, Croxted, Iden, Motor Carrier, Queen; voiturette: Achilles; light car: Gilburt; tricar: Garrard; motorcycle: Phelon & Moore, Zenith

US. Steam: Empire Steamer; electric: Berwick, Marquette; internal-combustion: American, American Mercedes, American Napier, Christie, Cleveland, Corbin, Detroit Wheeler, Dolson, Lambert, Luverne, Maxwell, Moline, Orlo, Oscar Lear, Pierce-Racine, Queen, Sampson, Schacht, Sinclair-Scott (Maryland), Standard, Studebaker-Garford, Twyford Stanhope; touring car: Brew-Hatcher, S&M Simplex, Crestmobile, Detroit Auto, Frayer-Miller, Jeffery, Pungs Finch, Richmond, Royal, Thomas, Upton; runabout: Courier, Fredonia, Northern, Pierce, Pope-Tribune; tractor: Holt

Brass era

1905

France. Internal-combustion: Alliance, Brasier, Charlon, Couverchel, Delage, Eudelin, Rolland-Pilain, Sizaire-Naudin; touring car: Rebour; light car: Helbé, Urric; voiturette: Eureka; motorcycle: Herdtle & Bruneau

Germany. Steam: Altmann; internal-combustion: Ehrhardt, Hansa, Hexe, Solidor

Italy. Internal-combustion: Diatto, Zust

UK. Electric: Alexandra, Ekstromer; internal-combustion: Adams, Austin, Edismith, Riley, Sunbeam-Talbot, Talbot; light car: One of the Best; tricar: Anglian; motorcycle:  Velocette

US. Electric: Rauch and Lang; internal-combustion: Aerocar, Ardsley, Ariel, Cartercar, Corwin, Crown, Harrison, Haynes, Silent Knight, Pullman, Rainier, Selden, Soules, Stoddard-Dayton; touring car: Detroit-Oxford, Diamond T, Gas-au-lec, Lambert, REO, USA Daimler; roadster: Walker, Western; light car: Bell, buggy: Deal, Hammer; motorcycle: Excelsior-Henderson, Harley-Davidson, Shawmobile

1906
Belgium. Internal-combustion: Imperia; hybrid: Auto-Mixte

France. Internal-combustion: AM, Ampère, Antoinette, Lion-Peugeot, Unic; light car: Doriot, Flandrin & Parant; voiturette and motorcycle: Alcyon

Germany. Internal-combustion: AAG

Italy. Internal-combustion: Aquila Italiana, Fial, Peugeot-Croizat, SCAT, SPA, Standard

UK. Internal-combustion: All-British, Ladas, Marlborough, Rolls-Royce; light car: Jowett; tricar: Addison, Armadale; dual-control car: Academy; hybrid bus: Tilling-Stevens; motorcycle: Dot

US. Steam: Doble, Ross; electric: Babcock; internal-combustion: ALCO, American, American Simplex, Apollo, Atlas, Bliss, Car de Luxe, Deere, Dorris, Dragon, Frontenac, Hol-Tan, Jewell, Kissel, Model, Moore (Ball-Bearing Car); touring car: Heine-Velox, Moon; roadster: Colburn; light car: Janney; high wheeler: ABC, Black, McIntyre, Success

1907
Belgium. Internal-combustion: Springuel

Canada. Internal-combustion: McLaughlin

France. Internal-combustion: Ariane, Jean-Bart, Lahaussois, Lutier, Marie de Bagneux, Prod'homme, Sinpar, Sixcyl; voiturette: Couteret, Obus, La Radieuse; voiturette tricar: Guerry et Bourguignon, Lurquin-Coudert; tricar: Austral, Mototri Contal; hybrid: AL; amphibious: Ravailler; racing car: De Bazelaire

UK. Internal-combustion: Dalgliesh-Gullane, Hillman; truck: Commer; motorcycle: Douglas

US. Electric: American Juvenile Electric, Detroit Electric; internal-combustion: Allen Kingston, Anderson, Carter Twin-Engine, Continental, Corbitt, Fuller, Griswold, Maryland, Kiblinger, Oakland, Regal, Speedwell; high wheeler: Eureka, Hatfield, Single Center, Staver; roadster: CVI; runabout: Albany, Colt Runabout, Kermath, Marvel, Nielson

1908
France. Internal-combustion: Le Pratic, X; phaeton: Siscart; voiturette: Roussel

Germany. Internal-combustion: Allright, Brennabor, Fafnir, Lloyd

Italy. Internal-combustion: Lancia, Marca-Tre-Spade, Temperino

Russia. Internal-combustion: Russo-Balt

UK. Internal-combustion: Arno, Sheffield-Simplex, Valveless; touring car: Argon; light car: Alex; motorcycle: Premier

US. Internal-combustion: Bendix, Coates-Goshen, Correja, Cunningham, De Luxe, General Motors, Gyroscope, Havers, Imperial, Paige, Sears, Velie; touring car: Moyer; high wheeler: Cole, De Schaum, DeWitt, Hobbie Accessible, Michigan; runabout: Simplo; cyclecar: Browniekar; buggy: Davis

1909
France. Internal-combustion: Bugatti, FL, La Ponette, Le Zèbre

Italy. Racing car: Brixia-Zust; motorcycle: Della Ferrera

Netherlands. Internal-combustion: Entrop

UK. Internal-combustion: Pilot

US. Internal-combustion: Abbott-Detroit, Anhut, Black Crow, Crow-Elkhart, Cutting, EMF, Everitt, Fuller, GJG, Hupmobile, Inter-State, Lion, Pilot; touring car: Crawford, Fal-Car, Piggins, Standard Six; roadster: Coyote, Hudson, Kauffman; runabout: Brush; small car: Herreshoff, Hitchcock, KRIT; light car: Courier; buggy: Paterson; raceabout: Mercer; racing car: McFarlan; truck: Chase, Sanford-Herbert

1910
Canada. Internal-combustion: Gareau

France. Internal-combustion: Ageron, Damaizin & Pujos, Margaria, Mathis, Plasson; light car: Simplicia; cyclecar: Bédélia

Germany. Internal-combustion: Ansbach, Apollo, Audi

Italy. Internal-combustion: Alfa Romeo, Chiribiri

UK. Steam: AMC; internal-combustion: Morgan, Siddeley-Deasy; cyclecar: GN

US. Electric: Grinnell; internal-combustion: Alpena, Cavac, De Mot, Flanders, Great Eagle, Kline Kar, Lexington, Maytag-Mason, Parry, Spaulding, United States; touring car: Carhartt, Chalmers, Detroit-Dearborn, Etnyre, Faulkner-Blanchard, Great Southern; tonneau: Henry, Midland; roadster: Ames, King-Remick, Penn; runabout: Empire; cyclecar: Autoette; high wheeler: Anchor Buggy; buggy: Aldo

1911
Canada. Internal-combustion: Clinton

France. Cyclecar: Enders

Germany. Internal-combustion: Excelsior-Mascot, Podeus; rotary valve: Standard

Italy. Motorcycle: Benelli

UK. Internal-combustion: Aberdonia, AGR, Airedale, GWK, Newton-Bennett, Roper-Corbet; cyclecar: Alvechurch, Autotrix, Lambert; motorcycle: Beardmore, Coventry-Victor, Levis, Rudge-Whitworth, Villiers

US. Electric: Hupp-Yeats, Century, Dayton Electric; internal-combustion: America, Ann Arbor, Chevrolet, Day, Gaylord, American Jonz (automobile) (The American), King, Komet, Marathon, Overland OctoAuto, Nyberg, Pilgrim of Providence, Rayfield, Stutz, Virginian, Willys; tractor: Mogul; fire-engine: Ahrens-Fox,

1912
Canada. Internal-combustion: Amherst

France. Electric: Anderson Electric, internal-combustion: Albatros, Alda, Arista, Cognet de Seynes, Hédéa, La Roulette, SCAP; light car: Luxior, truck: Laffly, avant-train: Ponts,

Hungary. Internal-combustion: Raba

Italy. Internal-combustion: Storero

Spain. Internal-combustion: Abadal

UK. Steam: Sheppee; internal-combustion: ABC; cyclecar: Adamson, Arden, Chota, Coventry Premier, Crouch, Hampton, HCE, Tiny, Tyseley; motorcycle: NUT, Sunbeam

US. Electric: Argo Electric, Buffalo Electric, Church-Field; internal-combustion: Anna, Briggs-Detroiter, Crane & Breed, Pathfinder, Standard; touring car: Miller, Westcott; light-car: Lad's Car, Little; tricar: American Tri-Car, motorcycle: Cyclone; truck: Brockway, Palmer-Moore

1913

Belgium. Internal-combustion: Alatac

France. Internal-combustion: Ajax, Alba, Alva, Rougier; cyclecar: Jouvie

Spain. Cyclecar: David

UK. Internal-combustion: Morris, Perry, Woodrow, WW; light car: Ace, Lucar; cyclecar: Armstrong, Athmac, Baker & Dale, Bantam, BPD, Britannia, Broadway, Carlette, Dallison, Dewcar, LAD, Lester Solus, Vee Gee, Warne, Wilbrook, Wrigley; motocycle: Montgomery

US. Electric: American Electric; internal-combustion: Allen (Ohio), Allen (Philadelphia), Chandler, Flyer, Grant, Lyons-Knight, Monarch; cyclecar: Car-Nation, Coey, Detroit Cyclecar, Downing-Detroit, Dudly Bug, Gadabout, JPL, Little Detroit Speedster, Little Princess, Twombly; touring car: Keeton; roadster: Saxon, Scripps-Booth; sports car: Duesenberg; motocycle: Bi-Autogo

1914
France. Internal-combustion: Ascot, Donnet-Zedel; light car: Nardini

Japan. Internal-combustion: DAT

Italy. Maserati

UK. Internal-combustion: Trojan, Utopian; light car: Bifort, cyclecar: Bradwell, Buckingham, Carden, Hill & Stanier, Imperial, Projecta, Simplic; motocycle: ABC

US. Electric: Ward; internal-combustion: Ajax, American, Benham, Dile, Keystone, Light, Monroe, MPM, Partin, Willys-Knight; touring car: Alter; roadster: Metz, Vulcan; light car: Fischer, Lincoln; cyclecar: Argo, Arrow, Biesel, CAC, Cricket, Davis, Dodge, Engler, Excel, Hawk, Logan, LuLu, Malcolm Jones, Mercury, Motor Bob, O-We-Go, Xenia

1915
Canada. Internal-combustion: Gray-Dort, Regal

UK. Internal-combustion: Atalanta; sports car: Aston Martin

US. Electric: Menominee, hybrid electric: Owen Magnetic, internal-combustion: All-Steel, Apple, Biddle, Bour-Davis, Briscoe, Dort, Elcar, Herff-Brooks, Hollier, Ross, Smith Flyer, light car: Bell, Harvard, cyclecar: Koppin, racing car: Frontenac,

1916
Russia: AMO

US. Electric: Belmont; internal-combustion: Aland, American Junior, Auto Red Bug, Bush, Daniels, Dixie Flyer, Hackett, HAL, Jordan, Liberty, Sun, Yale; touring car: Barley, Marion-Handley,

Germany: BMW

1917

Canada. Internal-combustion: Moose Jaw Standard

UK. Cyclecar: Gibbons

US. Internal-combustion: Able, Amalgamated, American, Anderson, Columbia, Commonwealth, Piedmont, Shad-Wyck, Templar; touring car: Harroun, Nelson, Olympian; light car: Gem; truck: Nash,

1918
Italy: trucks OM

UK. Internal-combustion: All British Ford; motorcycle: Cotton

US. Steam: Bryan, internal-combustion: Essex; motorcycle: Ner-a-Car

1919
France. Internal-combustion: Avions Voisin, Butterosi, Citroen, Leyat, Salmson; cyclecar: ASS, Soriano-Pedroso

Germany. Internal-combustion: AGA, Anker

UK. Internal-combustion: Alvis, Angus-Sanderson, Armstrong Siddeley, Ashton-Evans, Bentley, Dawson, Eric-Campbell, Maiflower, Ruston-Hornsby, Willys Overland Crossley; cyclecar: Aero Car, Ashby, AV, Castle Three, Economic, Tamplin; motorcycle: Brough Superior, Coventry-Victor, Dunelt, Duzmo

US. Internal-combustion: Amco, Argonne, Climber, Du Pont, Graham-Paige; truck: Huffman

Vintage era

1920
Belgium. Light car: ALP

France. Electric: Electricar; internal-combustion: Janémian, Jouffret, Radior; cyclecar: Able, Ajams, Astatic, La Comfortable, De Marçay, Elfe, Kevah, Santax; sports car: Fonlupt

Germany. Internal-combustion: Joswin, Selve; touring car: Steiger

Japan: Mazda

UK. Internal-combustion: Aeroford, Cubitt, Galloway, Palmerston, Payze; light car: Albert; cyclecar: Allwyn, Archer, Baughan, Bell, Black Prince, Blériot-Whippet, Bound, Cambro, CFB, Winson; sports car: Sports Junior

USA: Ace, Alsace, Aluminum, Astra, Binghamton Electric, Carroll, Colonial, Colonial/Shaw, Friend, Gardner, Gray Light Car, LaFayette, Lorraine, Mason Truck, Sheridan, Standard Steam Car, Stanwood

1921
Canada: Brock Six, London Six

France: Amilcar, Ballot, Bernardet, Coadou et Fleury, Colda, Le Favori, Georges Irat, Hinstin, Janoir, Madoz, Quo Vadis, Le Roitelet, Solanet

Germany: Alfi, Arimofa, Atlantic, Pawi, Rumpler Tropfenwagen, Zündapp

Italy: Ansaldo, Aurea, IENA, motorcycle: Moto Guzzi

Japan: Ales

UK: Amazon, Barnard, Scott Sociable, Skeoch

US. Steam: Coats, Davis, internal combustion: Adria, Aero Car, Ajax, Automatic, Birmingham, Colonial, Davis Totem, Durant, Earl, Handley-Knight, Jacquet Flyer, Kessler, Wills Sainte Claire

1922
Canada: Colonial

France: Astra, Bucciali, Induco, JG, Vaillant

Germany: Juho, Komet

UK: Abbey, Abingdon, Albatros, Alberford, Aster, Atomette, Autogear, Baby Blake, Bean, Bow-V-Car, Christchurch-Campbell, Clyno, Frazer Nash, Gwynne, Packman & Poppe, Wigan-Barlow, Xtra

US. Steam: Alena, American Steamer, Endurance, internal combustion: ABC, Anahuac, Ansted-Lexington, Checker, DAC, Dagmar, Detroit, Gray, Jewett, Kess-Line 8, Rickenbacker, Star, Stewart-Coats

1923
Belgium: ADK, De Wandre, Juwel

Canada. Steam: Brooks

France: Bell, Henou, Willème

Germany: Alan, Kenter, Pilot, motorcycle: BMW

UK: Astral, Urecar

USA: Flint, Rugby

1924
Czech Republic: Skoda

France: AEM, AS, Le Cabri, De Sanzy, Elgé, Jean Gras, Jousset

Germany: Amor, Ehrhardt-Szawe, Tempo

Japan: Otomo

UK: HRD, Morris, Paydell

US. Steam: American; internal-combustion: Chrysler, Junior R, Pennant

1925
Belgium: Jeecy-Vea

France: Heinis, Jack Sport

Germany: Hanomag, Sablatnig-Beuchelt, Seidel-Arop

Italy: Amilcar Italiana, Maggiora, Moretti

UK: Brocklebank, Invicta, Jappic, McEvoy, MG

USA: Empire Steam Car, Ajax, Diana

1926
France: Alma, Arzac, Chaigneau-Brasier, Constantinesco, Lambert, Ratier, SAFAF, Sensaud de Lavaud, Tracta

Germany: Daimler-Benz, Gutbrod, Mercedes-Benz

UK: Arab, HP, Marendaz, Swallow

USA: Ansted, Divco, Dodgeson
 Pontiac

1927
France: Rosengart, Silva-Coroner

UK: Arrol-Aster, Avro, Streamline (Burney Car)

USA: Falcon-Knight, Graham-Paige, LaSalle

Sweden: Volvo

1928
Germany: BMW, DKW

UK: Ascot, Vincent

USA: DeSoto, Plymouth

1929
France: Alphi, Michel Irat

Germany: Borgward

Italy: Ferrari

Soviet Union. Motorcycle: Izh

Spain: National Pescara

UK: Alta

USA: American Austin, Blackhawk, Cord, Roosevelt, Ruxton, Viking, Windsor

Pre-war years

1930
Belgium: Astra

France: AER, Virus

Germany: Ardie-Ganz

Soviet Union: KIM

1931
Germany: Maikäfer

Soviet Union: ZIS

Japan: Datsun

UK: Squire

USA: De Vaux, Hoffman (Detroit automobile)

1932
Italy: Nardi

Poland: Polski Fiat

Soviet Union: GAZ

UK: Vale Special

USA: Allied, De Vaux Continental, Jaeger

1933
France: Tracford

Germany: Standard Superior

UK: André, Railton

USA: Continental

1934

France: Simca

Germany: Auto Union, Bungartz Butz

Japan: Ohta Jidosha

UK: Aveling-Barford, British Salmson, Rytecraft

1935
France: Talbot-Lago

Germany: Henschel

UK: Autovia, Batten, Jensen, Reliant

USA: Stout Scarab

1936
France: Darl'mat, Monocar

UK: Allard, HRG, Lammas, Lloyd, Skirrow

Japan: Toyota

1937
France: Ardex, Danvignes

Germany: Volkswagen

UK: Atalanta

1938
France: DB, Rolux

UK: Nuffield

War years

1939
Soviet Union: SMZ

USA: Albatross, Crosley, truck: Peterbilt

Italy: Ferrari

1940
UK: DMW

1941
Soviet Union: UAZ; motorcycle: IMZ-Ural

1942
Brazil. Trucks: F.N.M.

1943
Soviet Union. Trucks: Ural

1945
Soviet Union. Motorcycle: Dnipro

UK: Bristol, Healey

USA: Kaiser-Frazer

Post-war years

1946
France: Chappe et Gessalin, Mochet, Rovin

Germany: Messerschmitt

Hungary: Csepel

Italy: Bandini, Cisitalia, Stanguellini; Trucks: Astra Veicoli Industriali

Soviet Union: Moskvitch; motorcycle: ZiD

Spain: Pegaso

UK: Cooper

USA: American Motors Incorporated, Frazer

1947
Canada: Studebaker

France: Aerocarene, Alamagny

Italy: Innocenti, Lambretta, Maserati, O.S.C.A.

Soviet Union. Trucks: Minsk Automobile Plant

UK: Ambassador, Ausfod, Buckler

USA: Airscoot, Davis, Playboy

1948
France: J-P Wimille

Germany: Fend Flitzer

Italy: Fimer, Iso Rivolta, Siata

Japan. Motorcycle: Marusho

Soviet Union. Trucks: BelAZ

UK: EMC, Land Rover, Rochdale, Thundersley Invacar

USA: Autoette, Keller, Tucker Sedan

1949
France: Atlas

India: AUTOPRD

Soviet Union: RAF

Japan: Honda (Motorcycle)

UK: Dellow, Jaguar Cars

USA: Aerocar, Airway, Glasspar G2; scooter: PMC

1950
France: Autobleu

Germany: Fuldamobil, Kersting-Modellbauwerkstätten, Kleinschnittger, Staunau

Spain: SEAT

UK: Marauder, Paramount

USA: Muntz

1951
France: Atlas, Automobiles Marathon, Le Piaf, Reyonnah

Germany: Glas

Poland: FSO

Soviet Union. Trucks: KAZ; motorcycle: Minsk

UK: Arnott, Russon, Turner

USA: Nash-Healey

1952
France: Martin-Spéciale, Poinard

Germany: Brütsch, Champion

Soviet Union: PAZ

UK: Austin-Healey, BMC, Greeves, Lotus

USA: Allstate, Woodill

1953
Germany: EMW

USA: Eshelman, Fina-Sport

1954
France: Alpine, Facel Vega

Spain: Serveta

UK: Astra, Fairthorpe, Rodley, Swallow Doretti

USA: AMC, Studebaker-Packard

1955
Belgium: Meeussen

France: Saviem, VELAM

Germany: Goggomobil, Zwickau

Italy: Autobianchi

Soviet Union: LAZ, LuAZ

UK: Ashley, Elva

1956
France: Arista

Germany: Heinkel Kabine

Soviet Union: ZiL, KAG; scooter: TMZ, Vyatka

UK: Berkeley, Tourette

USA: Auto Cub, Devin, Dual-Ghia

1957
France: Arbel, Atla

Germany: Neckar, Trabant

UK: Peerless (Warwick), Scootacar, Tornado

USA: Aurora, Hackney

1958
Soviet Union: KAvZ; trucks: BAZ, KrAZ

UK: Gill, Frisky

USA: Edsel, Streco Turnpike Cruiser

1959
India: Vehicle Factory Jabalpur

Soviet Union: LiAZ

UK: Bristol Siddeley, Gilbern, Marcos

USA: Argonaut, Nu-Klea Starlite

Classic era

1960
India: Ideal Jawa

UK: Ausper, Brabham, Rickman

US. Replica veteran car: Gaslight

1961
Germany: Amphicar

Soviet Union: ZAZ

UK: Diva

1962

Canada: Acadian

France: Automobiles René Bonnet

Soviet Union: AvtoKuban

Japan. Motorcycle: Kawasaki

USA: Apollo

1963
Italy: ATS, Scuderia Serenissima, Lamborghini

UK: Bond, Gordon-Keeble

USA: Exner Revival Cars; trucks: Marmon

Japan: Honda (Car)

1964
Italy: ASA

Soviet Union: ErAZ

USA: Fiberfab

1965
France: Matra

India: Heavy Vehicles Factory

Italy: Ferves

Soviet Union: IzhAvto

Spain: IPV

UK: Jago, Peel

1966
Bulgaria: Bulgarrenault

Italy: Bizzarrini

Soviet Union: Lada; trucks: MoAZ

Romania: Dacia

UK: Norton-Villiers, Trident, Unipower

1967
India: TATA MOTORS

1968
Italy: Autozodiaco, LMX Sirex

Turkey: Tofaş

UK: Piper

USA: Savage GT

1969
Soviet Union. Trucks: Kamaz

UK: Enfield

See also

Automotive industry in the United Kingdom
List of car manufacturers of the United Kingdom
Automotive industry in the United Kingdom
List of automobile manufacturers
List of current automobile manufacturers by country
List of current automobile marques
List of steam car makers
Orphan

References

Vintage vehicles
History of the automobile
Automotive industry
History of technology
 
Motor vehicle brands
Motor vehicle brands